Nick Parfitt  (born 23 June 1984) is a former professional rugby league player who played for the Brisbane Broncos.

References

Brisbane Broncos players
1984 births
Living people
Rugby league players from Queensland
Rugby league fullbacks
Rugby league wingers